Gloria Sanchez Productions is an American film and television production company.

History
In 2014, Jessica Elbaum founded the production company as a sister label of Gary Sanchez Productions, founded by Will Ferrell and Adam McKay, with a focus on female voices in comedy. Elbaum has worked with Ferrell since the founding of Gary Sanchez Productions as an executive producer and pitched the idea to create a female-focused production company.

In January 2020, the company was reorganized following the dissolution of Gary Sanchez Productions, and became Ferrell's primary production company while still maintaining a focus on female-centered stories. It entered a multi-year non exclusive first-look television deal with Netflix, and also entered a feature multi-year deal with Paramount Pictures. In 2021, it was moved to 20th Century Studios.

Filmography

Film

Television

References

 
Mass media companies established in 2014
Film production companies of the United States
Television production companies of the United States